The Seventies Story is the 16th and most recent album by pop group Brotherhood of Man, released in 2002. It is based on a live stage show the group had undertaken at the time.

Overview 
The show reflects on the music and events of the 1970s, with the group performing the songs, while one of the members narrates events in between. Songs from the show were recorded and included on this album, which was not officially released by a record company, but was produced by the group themselves for sale at the show or by mail order. The tracks from the album have since been released on generally available compact discs and for download. It is the group's first album to be solely available on CD and remains their most recent album release. Included among the tracks are a number of Brotherhood of Man's own hits such as "Save Your Kisses for Me". The album contains 26 tracks (although boasts 29 - the other three being part of a medley), most of which are full-length versions, while some are shortened down to one-minute snippets. Track "Let Me Sleep On It" is a retitling of Meat Loaf's "Paradise by the Dashboard Light", which while never a single in the United Kingdom, was a song the group had performed in concert for many years previously. Track "I Could Be So Good for You" is included to signify the beginning of the television series Minder, though the song itself wasn't a hit until 1980.

The group continue (in 2018) to perform the show around the United Kingdom and have received good reviews.

Track listing 
 "Love Grows" (Mason / Macaulay) 2.37 Originally by Edison Lighthouse, 1970
 "United We Stand" (Hiller / Goodison) 2.50  Originally by The Brotherhood of Man, 1970
 "Ernie" (Hill) 0.58 Originally by Benny Hill, 1971
 "Hot Love" (Bolan) 1.43 Originally by T. Rex, 1971
 "Puppy Love" (Anka) 1.05 Based on version by Donny Osmond, 1972
 "Daydreamer" (Demspey) 2.07 Originally by David Cassidy, 1973
 "Live and Let Die" (McCartney / McCartney) 1.16 Originally by Wings, 1973
 "Tie a Yellow Ribbon" (Brown / Levine) 2.56 Originally by Tony Orlando and Dawn, 1973
 "Remember You're a Womble" (Batt) 2.04 Originally by The Wombles, 1974
 "I've Got the Music in Me" (Boshell) 3.02 Originally by Kiki Dee, 1974
 "Shang-A-Lang / Bye Bye Baby" (Coulter / Crewe / Gaudio) 2.55 Originally by/Based on version by Bay City Rollers, 1974/75
 "Save Your Kisses for Me" (Hiller / Sheriden / Lee) 3.01 
 "Miss You Nights" (Townsend) 3.06 Originally by Cliff Richard, 1976
 "My Sweet Rosalie" / "Oh Boy (The Mood I'm In)" (Hiller / Sheriden / Lee / Romeo) 3.04
 "Don't Give Up on Us Baby" (Macaulay) 1.27 Originally by David Soul, 1976
 "Angelo" (Hiller / Sheriden / Lee) 3.03
 "Got to Get You Into My Life" (Lennon / McCartney) 4.04 Based on version by Earth, Wind and Fire, 1978
 "Figaro" (Hiller / Sheriden / Lee) 2.55
 "You're the One That I Want" / "Summer Nights" (Farrar / Jacobs / Casey) 2.24 Originally by John Travolta and Olivia Newton-John, 1978 
 "Blame It on the Boogie" (Jackson-Clark / Jackson-Rich / Krohn) 2.22 Originally by Mick Jackson, 1978
 "Beautiful Lover" (Hiller / Sheriden / Lee) 3.10
 "Let Me Sleep On It" (Steinman) 4.13 Originally by Meat Loaf, 1977
 "I Could Be so Good for You" (Kenny / Waterman) 1.13 Originally by Dennis Waterman, 1980
 "I Will Survive" (Fakaris) 2.33 Originally by Gloria Gaynor, 1979
 "Tragedy" (Gibb / Gibb / Gibb) 3.30 Originally by Bee Gees, 1979
 "Y.M.C.A." (Morali / Belolo / Willis) 3.25 Originally by Village People, 1978

References 

Brotherhood of Man albums
2002 albums